Nowe Biskupice may refer to:

Nowe Biskupice, Lubusz Voivodeship, Poland
Nowe Biskupice, Masovian Voivodeship, Poland

See also
Stare Biskupice (disambiguation)
Biskupice (disambiguation)